"Rock On" is the debut single by American country music artist Tucker Beathard. It was released in March 2016 as the first single from Beathard's debut EP Fight Like Hell. Beathard wrote the song with his father, Casey Beathard, and Marla Cannon-Goodman. It was included on his extended play, Fight Like Hell, released on October 7.

Critical reception
An uncredited Taste of Country review of the song was positive, saying that "Every note and guitar lick of this scorned country rocker feels genuine and sincere. There’s little doubt he has a face in mind as he sings about the girl that got away, and then changes to the point that he doesn’t want her back anymore anyway."

Commercial performance
The song has sold 216,000 copies in the United States as of October 2016.

Music video
The music video was directed by Good One, a collaboration between brothers Ry and Drew Cox, and premiered in May 2016.

Chart performance

Weekly charts

Year end charts

See also
 Nobody's Everything (2018)

References

2016 songs
2016 debut singles
Tucker Beathard songs
Dot Records singles
Songs written by Casey Beathard
Songs written by Marla Cannon-Goodman